Dorypteryx is a genus of cave barklice in the family Psyllipsocidae. There are at least 4 described species in Dorypteryx.

Species
 Dorypteryx domestica (Smithers, 1958)
 Dorypteryx longipennis Smithers, 1991
 Dorypteryx pallida Aaron, 1883
 Dorypteryx yunnanica  Li, Fasheng & X. Liu 2009

References

Further reading

 

Trogiomorpha
Taxa named by Samuel Francis Aaron